The 2023 Karachi local government elections were held in Karachi, Pakistan on 15 January 2023 to elect members of local councils. These members would then elect the Mayor of Karachi (2023-2027). These elections were the 3rd Karachi local government elections.

Background 
In the 2015 elections, the Muttahida Qaumi Movement - Pakistan (MQM-P) won 64.5% of the votes and enough seats to elect their candidate, Waseem Akhtar, to the position of Mayor of Karachi. They were followed by the Pakistan Peoples Party (PPP) with 11.5%, and the Pakistan Muslim League (N) (PML(N)) with 9.2%.

These elections are being held in the aftermath of a successful no-confidence motion against Prime Minister Imran Khan, which saw Shehbaz Sharif becoming the Prime Minister of Pakistan with a coalition government of 9 parties, including the MQM-P, PPP, and PML(N).

Merger of MQM factions 
Since the appointment of Kamran Tessori as the Governor of Sindh, efforts began to merge breakaway factions of the MQM-P like the Pak Sarzameen Party (PSP) and the Farooq Sattar group back into the MQM-P to unite their vote bank to overcome the growing popularity of Pakistan Tehreek-e-Insaf (PTI). The Mohajir Qaumi Movement Pakistan - Haqiqi (MQM-H) was also approached, but refused to merge the with the MQM-P.

On the evening of 12 January 2023 Mustafa Kamal, the leader of the PSP, and Farooq Sattar announced their merger with the MQM-P in a press conference.

Campaign

Pakistan Tehreek-e-Insaf 
Pakistan Tehreek-e-Insaf Sindh President Ali Zaidi announced that Pakistan Tehreek-e-Insaf will go solo unlike 2015 when Pakistan Tehreek-e-Insaf allied with Jamat-e-Islami. He also announced that Pakistan Tehreek-e-Insaf will run their campaign under the slogan . Out of 246 UCs across Karachi, Pakistan Tehreek-e-Insaf fielded candidates for 241 UC's. PTI is contesting its senior leader Ashraf Qureshi from 2 UCs of Nazimabad Town. Ashraf Qureshi is a founding member of PTI from Karachi and is considered to be a backbone of PTI Karachi workers. He is one of the candidates for Mayor but the Chairman of Pakistan Tehreek-e-Insaf Imran Khan will ultimately decide the Mayor nominee.

Jamaat-e-Islami 
Jamaat e Islami Karachi, led by Karachi chief Hafiz Naeem Ur Rehman ran a focused campaign on ground (rallies and events) and on social and electronic media. They highlighted the atrocities that the Federal and Provincial Governments have committed against the people of Karachi by depriving them of basic necessities like water, electricity, infrastructure, public transport, green spaces, cleanliness, safety and security. Karachi is listed in one of the worst cities to live in Global Livability Index 2022 even though it gives highest tax in Pakistan. Other cities of Pakistan are growing rapidly while Karachi shows picture of a destroyed city due to some disaster. The campaign slogan took social media by storm. Local polls suggested Hafiz Naeem ur Rehman is the most popular leader and 58% Karachiites want him to become the next mayor.

Jamaat-e-Islami Karachi Chief Hafiz Naeem ur Rehman submitted his nomination papers for Al-Falah UC-8 North Nazimabad. Jamat-e-Islami had 233 Chairmen contesting in 246 Union Councils.

Timeline 
 On 1 September 2020, local governments across Sindh were dissolved after completion of their terms.
 In December 2021, Government of Sindh announced that it would hold local government elections in February or March 2022.
Later, the Election Commission of Pakistan (ECP) announced that the elections would be held on 24 July 2022.
On 20 July, the ECP rescheduled the elections to 28 August, citing "possible rains and bad weather".
On 24 August, the ECP once again postponed the elections due to rains and risk of urban flooding. According to a press release, “the new date will be announced when the weather conditions improve”.
On 14 September, the ECP announced the new date for the election to be 23 October.
On 18 October , the ECP postponed the election for a third time, accepting a request from the Government of Sindh.
On 22 November, the ECP announced the new date for the election to be 15 January.
On 12 January, the Government of Sindh requested the ECP to postpone the elections. However, on 13 January, the ECP rejected this request and declared that elections would be held on 15 January, as scheduled.

Voter Statistics

Karachi Metropolitan Corporation Composition 
Karachi Metropolitan Corporation has 367 members out of which 246 are directly elected by the people of Karachi. Karachi Division is divided into 7 districts, which are further divided into 25 Town Municipal Corporations and further divided into 246 Union Committees (UCs). All 246 UCs elect a chairman and vice chairman on one ballot and councilor on another ballot. Chairman UC of majority party will become the Mayor whereas Vice Chairmen will be members of the Town Municipal Corporation which will further indirectly elect 33% Women, 5% Youth, 5% Laborers, 5% Non-Muslims, 1% Disabled and 1% Transgender's members on reserved seats.

Every UC is divided into 4 wards which elect one councilor. 2 women councilors, 1 youth councilor, 1 laborer and 1 Non-Muslim councilor are indirectly elected.

Parties

Results

Aftermath 
After declaration of results, Jamat-e-Islami and Pakistan Tehreek-e-Insaf are likely to form coalition government in Karachi. Jamat-e-Islami leader Hafiz Naeem will become mayor. PPP leader Saeed Ghani said that PPP welcomes all parties except PTI for coalition and mayor election. Meanwhile Pakistan Tehreek-e-Insaf Leader Firdous Shamim Naqvi said to support Jamat-e-Islami.

After recount on 16 January, Jamat-e-Islami gained 2 UC's while People's Party lost 2. Recount is still due on many UC's in which result is controversial.

FAFEN a prominent election watch organization stated that Karachi Elections were rigged and elections were affected because of rigging.

Both PTI and JI joined hands against PPP's rigging of Karachi local polls. In a joint Press Conference, Ali Zaidi and Hafiz Naeem stated that PPP with the help of Sindh election commission rigged and changed result of many UC's

By-elections were triggered by the resignations of dozens of Pakistan Tehreek-e-Insaf lawmakers and the dissolution of the assemblies in Punjab and Khyber-Pakhtunkhwa. The Election Commission of Pakistan had requested the General Headquarters (GHQ) of the army and the Lahore High Court (LHC) for providing soldiers and judicial officers for security and voting during the by-elections and the provincial assembly elections in Punjab and Khyber-Pakhtunkhwa. GHQ declined the request due to overwhelming involvement in internal security challenges and the census, while the LHC declined due to a huge backlog of pending cases.

References 

2021 local elections
2022 local
Local elections in Pakistan
Future elections in Pakistan
2023 elections in Pakistan
2023 in Sindh